Marienburg Castle may refer to:

Malbork Castle in Poland
Marienburg Castle (Hanover) in Germany
Marienburg Castle (Hildesheim) in Germany

See also
 Marienburg (disambiguation)